Metaksia Simonyan (21 February 1926 – 11 August 1987) was a Soviet Armenian actress of film and theater.

Biography 
Metaksia Simonyan was born in 1926 in Ashkhabad. In 1933 Metaksia Simonyan moved to Yerevan with her family. In 1948 she graduated from Yerevan State Institute of Theatre and Cinematography. In the same year she was invited to Sundukyan State Academic Theatre. Since 1968 she has taught at Yerevan State Academy of Fine Arts of Armenia.

In the course of studying she played Katerina's (Feodor Sologod's "Penny Plucked"), Anani's (Gabriel Sundukyan’s "Once Again Another Victim") roles.

Among the first memorable roles are Armanush (Grigor Ter-Grigoryan's These Stars are Ours, USSR State Prize, 1950), Nina (Mikhail Lermontov’s Masquerade, Arbenin, Vahram Papazian).

Career
Simonyan continued Arus Voskanyan and Ruzanna Vardanyan's traditions in the Armenian theatre. She also played the same role in the plays of Russian, Western European and Armenian authors, played comic, and tragic roles. Metaksya Simonyan was a leading actress for decades, characters she played include: Shura (Maxim Gorky’s Yegor Bulichov and Others), Desdemona, Juliet, Cordelia (William Shakespeare's Othello, Romeo and Juliet, King Lear), Susan (Alexander Shirvanzade’s Namus) Then she played the roles of Hudit (Karl Gutzkow’s " (Uriel Acosta), Noudar (Nairi Zarian’s Ara Beautiful), Catherine Leffier (Victorian Sardou and Madame San Jen of Ezezip Moro), Martha (Edward Albee’s Who's afraid of Virginia Woolf, last role), etc.

Simonyan also played the role of Nastasia Philipovna (according to Fyodor Dostoevsky’s novel Idiot).
Namus performance is based on Alexander Shirvanzade's Namus poem, which tells about the love of the young couple, Seyran and Susan, which has a tragic end because of patriarchal prejudice. Here Metaksia Simonyan played Susan's role.
Metaksia Simonyan has been shotted in cinema (Anahit, 1947, "A Girl From Ararat Valley", 1949, To Whom The Life Smiles, 1957, A Jump Over the Precipice in 1959, Waters Rise, 1962, The Last Deed of Kamo, 1973, Hayfilm, Sayat-Nova, 1960, TV movie, etc.). She also has recited poetry and played on radio and television shows. Simonyan has performed in Moscow, Baku, Tbilisi, Beirut, Damascus and elsewhere.

She died on 11 August 1987 in Yerevan, Armenia.

Filmography 
 1947 – Anahit (as Anahit)
 1949 – A Girl From Ararat Valley (as Anush)
 1955 – Looking of the Addressee (as Manush)
 1954 – Trifle (as Varduhi)
 1957 – To Whom the Life Smiles (as Zaruhi)
 1959 – Her Fantasy (as nurse)
 1959 – A Jump Over the Precipice (as Gayane)
 1960 – Sayat-Nova (as Anna)
 1962 – Waters Rise (as Arev)
 1970 – A Spring of Heghnar (Mkrtich's mother)
 1971 – Khatabala (in the episodes)
 1973 – The Last Deed of Kamo (as Arsha)

Theatrical performances

References

Armenian actresses
1926 births
People from Ashgabat
1987 deaths
20th-century Armenian actresses
Turkmenistan people of Armenian descent
People's Artists of the USSR
Soviet Armenians